Grain station (TQ 869 750 ) was a railway station in the Medway, England. It opened on 3 September 1951, replacing Grain Crossing Halt, and closed on 4 December 1961. It was located between Grain Crossing Halt and Port Victoria stations.

References

Disused railway stations in Kent
Railway stations in Great Britain opened in 1951
Railway stations in Great Britain closed in 1961
Transport in Medway
Railway stations opened by British Rail
1951 establishments in England
1961 disestablishments in England